Dehnberger Hoftheater is a theatre in Lauf an der Pegnitz, Franconia.

Theatres in Bavaria